Yin Yijun (born September 8, 1983 in Yangpu, Shanghai) is a Chinese sprint canoer who competed in the mid-2000s. At the 2004 Summer Olympics in Athens, he was eliminated in the semifinals of the K-2 500 m event, while being disqualified in the semifinals of the K-2 1000 m event.

References

Sports-Reference.com profile

1983 births
Living people
Canoeists from Shanghai
Olympic canoeists of China
Canoeists at the 2004 Summer Olympics
Asian Games medalists in canoeing
Canoeists at the 2002 Asian Games
Chinese male canoeists
Medalists at the 2002 Asian Games
Asian Games bronze medalists for China